Tod Carroll is an American screenwriter, a former writer for National Lampoon magazine, and film producer best known for such films as Clean and Sober, O.C. and Stiggs and National Lampoon's Movie Madness.

References

External links

American male screenwriters
American film producers
Place of birth missing (living people)
Year of birth missing (living people)
National Lampoon people
Living people